Denham Town is a predominantly residential neighbourhood in western Kingston, Jamaica. It has a reputation as one of Kingston's more violent areas. It was named in memory of Edward Brandis Denham, Governor of  Jamaica 1935–1938.

Amenities
There is a police station, and three schools: Denham Town Primary, St. Alban's Primary (the oldest of the three. It is 127 years old,) and Denham Town High.

See also
List of cities and towns in Jamaica

References

External links
Aerial view.

Neighbourhoods in Kingston, Jamaica
Populated places in Saint Andrew Parish, Jamaica